G. Thalapathi is an Indian Politician and was a Member of the Legislative Assembly of Tamil Nadu. He was elected to the Tamil Nadu legislative assembly as a Dravida Munnetra Kazhagam (DMK) Candidate from Sedapatti constituency in the 1996 election. And he contested the 2021 Tamil Nadu Legislative Assembly election from the Madurai North  constituency of the DMK, competing as a  Candidate.

Electoral performance

References 

Dravida Munnetra Kazhagam politicians
Living people
Tamil Nadu MLAs 1996–2001
Year of birth missing (living people)
Tamil Nadu MLAs 2021–2026